is a Japanese former professional baseball pitcher. He previously played for the Hokkaido Nippon-Ham Fighters and Tokyo Yakult Swallows of the Nippon Professional Baseball(NPB).

On November 30, 2019, he announced his retirement.

References

1989 births
Living people
Hokkaido Nippon-Ham Fighters players
Japanese baseball players
Nippon Professional Baseball pitchers
Baseball people from Okinawa Prefecture
Tokyo Yakult Swallows players